Voxx International is an American consumer electronics company founded as Audiovox Corporation in 1960, and renamed Voxx in 2012. It is headquartered in Orlando, Florida. The company specializes in four areas: OEM and after-market automotive electronics, consumer electronics accessories, and consumer and commercial audio equipment.

Over the years, Voxx International has purchased a number of recognizable brandnames when the original companies were no longer viable as independent specialty shops, including  Acoustic Research, Advent, Code Alarm, Invision, Jensen, Klipsch, Prestige, RCA, 808 Audio, and Terk, among others. Its international brands include Audiovox, Hirschmann, Heco, Incaar, Oehlbach, Mac Audio, Magnat, Schwaiger, and others. In addition, the company licenses the Energizer brand.

History 
In 2020, Voxx International Corporation announced the change of name Klipsch Holding, LLC, which became Premium Audio Company, LLC. Premium Audio Company, LLC consists of two subsidiaries: Klipsch Group, Inc (brands: Klipsch, Jamo, Energy, ProMedia) and 11 Trading Company, LLC.

In May 2021, Voxx International and Sharp Corporation began negotiations with Onkyo to purchase its home audiovisual division. Voxx's subsidiary Premium Audio Company (PAC) entered a joint venture with Sharp to acquire the business, which includes the Onkyo and Integra brands, for $30.8 million. PAC would own 75% of the joint venture and Sharp 25%. PAC would manage all product development, engineering, sales, marketing, and distribution while Sharp would be responsible for manufacturing and supply chain management of Onkyo products. The acquisition was completed in September 2021.

Brands
Voxx International markets its products under several brand names, including:
 808 Audio
 Acoustic Research
 Advent
 Audiovox
 CarLink
 Champ
 Chipmunks
 Code-Alarm
 Directed Electronics
 FlashLogic
 Hirschmann
 Incaar
 InVision Technologies
 Jamo
 Jensen Electronics
 Klipsch
 Magnat
 Onkyo
 Pioneer Electronics 
 Prestige
 Pursuit
 PursuiTrak
 RCA
 Surface Clean
 Terk
 Zentral Home Command

Product types

Electronics
In 2013, Audiovox developed the app for a new accessory device called Shutterball. Cellcom Communications holds the exclusive rights to the device.

Around 2010, Audiovox developed various wireless communication products, some of them were walkie-talkies and cordless phones.

Restatements
On March 14, 2003, Audiovox said it planned to restate results for the first three quarters of fiscal 2002, following a review of the effect of the FASB's Emerging Issues Task Force regulations on its statements. The restatement would lower revenue by about $462,000, and increase income by $36,000. On April 15, 2003, Audiovox announced to restate results for fiscal years 2000, 2001, and the first three quarters of fiscal 2002.

References

External links

 

Companies based in Orlando, Florida
Companies listed on the Nasdaq
Electronics companies established in 1960
Audio equipment manufacturers of the United States
Loudspeaker manufacturers
Mobile phone manufacturers
Technology companies established in 1960